Nokwanda Mngeni is a South African accountant and business executive. She was CEO of Eskom Uganda Limited (EUL), an electricity utility company that manages two government-owned hydroelectric power stations, for a 20-year concession under a Uganda government regulatory framework. EUL is a wholly owned subsidiary of Eskom, the South African energy conglomerate.

Background and education
She was born in Eastern Cape, South Africa, circa 1962, to Mercy Nisipho and Belton Bonsile. She is the fourth-born in a family of eight siblings.

She studied at Fort Hare University, graduating with a Bachelor of Commerce degree. She then transferred to the University of South Africa, where she obtained a Bachelor of Accounting Science degree. Later, she obtained an Executive Diploma in Strategic Management and an Advanced Certificate in Auditing from the City University of New York in the United States.

Work history
Nokwanda career goes back to 1993 when she joined Eskom as an accountant. She rose through the ranks, serving as finance manager, then as finance director. She was transferred to Eskom's 100 percent subsidiary, Eskom Uganda Limited in 2003, serving as chief finance officer until 2008, when she was named CEO of EUL.

During her tenure at the helm of EUL, she is credited with the establishment of a talents management programme at the company. The programme identifies capable employees, who are then trained to fit into leadership roles in the energy sector. Since 2003, more than ten individuals have been trained and hired/retained at EUL. She is also credited with the founding of Electricity Generators and Distributors of Uganda (EGADOU), an association that promotes best practices and information-sharing among workers in the industry.

In May 2015, Nokwanda Mngeni was named among the "60 Most Influential Figures in the East and West African Energy Sectors" by ESI Africa, an African portal for power and utility stakeholders.

See also
 Thozama Gangi
 Nancy Onyango
 Tebogo Mashego

References

External links
Self-belief, visibility key to success, says Eskom CEO
South Africa protests detention of Eskom boss As at 14 March 2012.

1962 births
Living people
University of Fort Hare alumni
University of South Africa alumni
City University of New York alumni
Xhosa people
South African accountants
South African chief executives
20th-century South African businesswomen
20th-century South African businesspeople
People from the Eastern Cape
South African women business executives
Women accountants
21st-century South African businesswomen
21st-century South African businesspeople
Women chief executives
South African corporate directors